The 1978 FIVB Women's World Championship was the eighth edition of the tournament, organised by the world's governing body, the FIVB. It was held from 25 August to 7 September 1978 in the Soviet Union.

Teams

 
 
 
 
 
 
 
 
 
 
 
 

 
 
 
  (withdraw)

Squads

Venues

Source:

Format
The tournament was played in three different stages (first, second and final rounds). A single round-robin format was played within each group to determine the teams group position, all teams progressed to the next round.

A single round-robin format was played within each group to determine the teams group position, matches already played between teams in the  also counted in this round, all teams progressed to the next round.

Winners and losers of all semifinals played a last match for final standings places.

Pools composition

Results

First round

Pool A
Location: Leningrad

|}

|}

Pool B
Location: Volgograd

|}

|}

Pool C
Location: Leningrad

|}

|}

Pool D
Location: Minsk

|}

|}

Pool E
Location: Riga

|}

|}

Pool F
Location: Volgograd

|}

|}

Second round
The results and the points of the matches between the same teams that were already played during the first round are taken into account for the second round.

1st–12th pools

Pool G
Location: Leningrad

|}

|}

Pool H
Location: Volgograd

|}

|}

13th–23rd pools

Pool I
Location: Minsk

|}

|}

Pool L
Location: Riga

|}

|}

Final round

21st–23rd places

21st–23rd semifinals

|}

21st place match

|}

17th–20th places

17th–20th semifinals

|}

19th place match

|}

17th place match

|}

13th–16th places

13th–16th semifinals

|}

15th place match

|}

13th place match

|}

9th–12th places

9th–12th semifinals

|}

11th place match

|}

9th place match

|}

5th–8th places

5th–8th semifinals

|}

7th place match

|}

5th place match

|}

Finals

Semifinals

|}

3rd place match

|}

Final

|}

Final standing

References

External links
 FIVB Results
 Results - todor66
 Federation Internationale de Volleyball

FIVB Women's World Championship
FIVB Women's World Championship
FIVB Women's World Championship
1978
Sports competitions in Saint Petersburg
1970s in Leningrad
Women's volleyball in the Soviet Union
August 1978 sports events in Europe
September 1978 sports events in Europe